Chu ( or Châu is a Vietnamese surname. It is transliterated as Zhou (for Chu) and Zhu (for Châu) in Chinese, and Ju in Korean. 

Chau is the anglicized variation of Châu.

Notable people with the surname Chu/Châu
Chu Văn An   
Châu Văn Tiếp (Châu Doãn Ngạnh), 18th century Vietnamese military commander
 Chau Giang (Chau Tu Giang), professional poker player.
Chau Nguyen (born 1973), Vietnamese-American news anchor
François Chau (born 1959), Cambodian-American actor

Vietnamese-language surnames
vi:Chu (họ)